Karuna may refer to:

Karuṇā, part of the spiritual path in Buddhism and Jainism.
Karuna Kodithuwakku (born 1961), Sri Lankan politician
Vinayagamoorthy Muralitharan (born 1966), also known as Colonel Karuna
Karuna, Finland, former municipality in Finland
Karuna, Bangladesh
Karuna (album), an album by Nawang Khechog
Karuna (film), a 1966 Malayalam language film